Băneasa is a commune located in Giurgiu County, Muntenia, Romania. It is composed of four villages: Băneasa, Frasinu, Pietrele and Sfântu Gheorghe.

External links 
 30 houses and over 6000 objects belonging to Gumelniţa neolithic culture discovered at Pietrele

References

Communes in Giurgiu County
Localities in Muntenia